Rafael Seijas was a Venezuelan political figure. He served as the Minister of Foreign Affairs of Venezuela multiple terms, holding the position as of 1882. In 1883 and 1884, he oversaw the process of drawing maps between the boundaries of British Guiana and Venezuela, working with a Colonel Mansfield until April 1884. He authored a series of papers in 1898, again on the arbitration of the Venezuela and British Guiana borders.

See also
List of Ministers of Foreign Affairs of Venezuela

References

External links

 

Venezuelan Ministers of Foreign Affairs